This is a list of people who have been official Guests of Honor at the World Science Fiction Convention, since the first Worldcon in 1939.

Each Worldcon committee selects the Guests of Honor (often just "GoH" in publications) for the convention. Typical categories are Author (or "Writer" or just "Pro"), Fan, Artist, Editor and Media, (though some Worldcon GoH slates are not categorised, reflecting that some honorees have contributed in more than one aspect of the genre and that the honor is equal across all those selected). While other conventions may select guests on the basis of popularity, Worldcons usually select Guests of Honor as an acknowledgement of significant lifetime contribution to the field; typically at least 25 years of activity. Selection as a Worldcon GoH is treated by authors, fans, and others in the SF field as a lifetime achievement award.

References
List at www.smofinfo.com

External links
 Worldcon official website - LongListNotes page

Guest of honor
Worldcon Guest of Honor